Sacramento City Hall is a five-story, 267,000-square-foot building that combines modern and historic structures in Sacramento, California. The building can house up to 730 staff members. Prominent local architect Rudolph A. Herold designed the building in 1908. Completed in 1909, the building is located at 915 I Street. Sacramento City Hall went through a major $11 million restoration from 2003 to 2005. The restoration was part of an overall $60 million civic center project with city hall as the cornerstone. Another part of the civic center project was the construction of underground parking garage for 170 cars. Sacramento City Hall now houses all of the city's significant municipal functions.

Municipal services housed at Sacramento City Hall
Mayor's Office
City Council Chambers
City attorney's office
City auditor
City clerk
City code
Employment
City manager
City treasurer
Codes & policies
Department directors
Records library

City departments
Community Development
Convention & Cultural Services
Economic Development
Sacramento Fire Department
Finance Department
General Services
Human Resources
Information Technology
Parks and Recreation
Sacramento Police Department
Public Works
Utilities

References

Buildings and structures in Sacramento, California
City halls in California
Government buildings completed in 1909